John Seymour, 4th Duke of Somerset and 3rd Marquess of Hertford (before 164629 April 1675) was an English peer and MP.

He was the only surviving son of William Seymour, 2nd Duke of Somerset, and Lady Frances Devereux. In 1656, he married Sarah, daughter and co-heiress of Sir Edward Alston and widow of George Grimston.

He was elected Member of Parliament for Marlborough in 1661 and entered Gray's Inn in 1666. He succeeded his nephew as the 4th Duke of Somerset in 1671.

He died in 1675, childless, and was buried in Salisbury Cathedral. He was succeeded in the dukedom by his cousin, Francis Seymour. The Marquessate of Hertford became extinct on his death.

References

1640s births
1675 deaths
504
Members of Gray's Inn
Lord-Lieutenants of Somerset
Lord-Lieutenants of Wiltshire
English MPs 1661–1679
John, 1675
Marquesses of Hertford (1641 creation)
Younger sons of dukes